Results from Norwegian football in 1932. See also 1931 in Norwegian football and 1933 in Norwegian football

Østlandsligaen 1931/32 (Unofficial)
League discontinued after this season.

Hovedserien

Underserie I

Underserie II

Underserie III

Class A of local association leagues
Class A of local association leagues (kretsserier) is the predecessor of a national league competition.

1In the following season, Hordaland local association split into Midthordland and Sunnhordland.

Norwegian Cup

Final

Northern Norwegian Cup

Final

National team

Sources:

Results

Nordic Football Championship

Table

References

 
Seasons in Norwegian football